WJNH is a Christian radio station licensed to Conway, New Hampshire and serving the North Conway, New Hampshire and Fryeburg, Maine areas, broadcasting on 91.1 MHz FM. WJNH is owned by New Hampshire Gospel Radio, Inc.

Originally licensed in 2012, holding the call sign holding the call sign WMTP, its call sign was changed to WJNH on April 11, 2022.

References

External links
 Official Website
 

2012 establishments in New Hampshire
Radio stations established in 2012
JNH